This is a list of Swedish princesses from the accession of Gustaf I, from the House of Vasa, and continues through the Houses of Palatinate-Zweibrücken, Holstein-Gottorp and Bernadotte, the adoptive heirs of the House of Holstein-Gottorp, who were the adoptive heir of the Palatinate-Zweibrückens. 

An individual holding the title of "princess of Sweden" would usually also be styled Her Royal Highness. However, three of the four sisters of Carl XVI Gustaf, lost this style upon their marriages to commoners though retained their titles as a courtesy. Additionally, on 7 October 2019, Carl XVI Gustaf issued a decree limiting the style of Royal Highness to his child and heir's heirs, though allowing his granddaughters who lost the style through this decree to retain their titles, duchies and place in the line of succession.

List of Swedish princesses by birth

List of Swedish princesses by marriage

References

Swedish princesses
Swedish monarchy
Princesses
Princesses